Didier Hernández Fernández (born July 18, 1979 in Havana) is a Cuban singer who was a member of the well known boy band Menudo. He was one of the last members of the group to join while the band was still named "Menudo". He was the second member of Cuban descent, after Ashley Ruiz (whom he replaced).

Didier was a forming member of boy band MDO , reaching numerous hits world-wide. 

He has released multiple singles after his first solo album titled 'Destino ' 

The latest releases can be heard on all platforms as Didier creates new music constantly

Musical career
Didier Hernández was chosen as a member of Menudo in 1995; two years later, Edgardo Díaz had sold the band's original name and renamed it MDO. Bandmates were Abel Talamántez, Alexis Grullón, Edgar Antonio "Anthony" Galindo, Daniel René, Pablo Portillo, Troy Tuminelli, and Caleb Avilés.

During his seven years as a member of MDO, Hernández became a teen idol in Puerto Rico and across Latin America. He visited Europe and Asia, a total of 39 countries around the world, becoming a known artist among teenage Hispanic females in the United States. Hernández recorded a total of seven CDs during this period, including Tiempo de Amar ("Time to Fall in Love"), MDO, Un Poco Más ("A Little More"), Subir Al Cielo (which was also recorded in English as Little Piece of Heaven), and a greatest-hits CD.

Hernández continued with his singing career, trying to become a solo singer. After one year of music production he opened a record label called DGMUSIC, which was distributed by Sony/BMG, through Avalon and, on August 23, 2005, his first solo CD, titled Destino ("Destiny"), was released. That same day, he announced a deal with American retail chain Wal-Mart, where he would hold "sign and greet" sessions with fans who bought his CD. The first single "Diva" was released, followed by "Te Juro Amor" (I Swear to You My Love), finishing a promo tour in May 2006.

In 2006 Hernández opened a production company, Rec International, and recorded several music products that were later on released in 2008 via Synergy Entertainment, another company own by Hernández.

Didier Hernández is currently the president of Trading Connections, an artist-booking agency.

In 2011 Didier Hernández got together with former MDO members to do a reunion tour that lasted until 2015, and the band released a single, "Ya no queda mas". An album, MDO Is Back, was scheduled to be released in 2018.

A new musical production was to be released in 2018.

See also
List of Cubans

External links
didierhernandez.com
menudoonline.com

 

1979 births
Living people
Cuban male singers
Menudo (band) members